Common artery may refer to:

 Common carotid artery
 Common hepatic artery
 Common iliac artery
 Common interosseous artery
 Common palmar digital arteries
 Common plantar digital arteries
 Penile artery, also known as the common penile artery